The Naked Skinnies were a new wave band from Ohio that featured Mark Eitzel, guitar and vocals, Nancy Kangas, organ; John Hricko, bass and Greg Bonnell, drums. 

The band was active from 1981 to 1982 in Columbus, Ohio and San Francisco, California. They released one single in 1981. Greg Bonnell continued to perform in an early version of American Music Club with Mark Eitzel. John Hricko went on to drum for San Francisco band, The Invertebrates.

Discography
All My Life / This Is The Beautiful Night (7") - Naked House Records - 1981

References
Wish The World Away: Mark Eitzel and the American Music Club by Sean Body, SAF Publishing, Ltd. (April 1999),

External links
[ Mark Eitzel's Allmusic entry]
Discography of Ohio Art and Pop 1977-1983 by Henry Weld.

Rock music groups from Ohio
Musical groups from Columbus, Ohio
American new wave musical groups